Palanan Airport is a community airport in the Philippines located in the Pacific coastal town of Palanan, Isabela. It is one of the two community airports in the province, the other being Maconacon Airport in the municipality of Maconacon.

Airlines and Destinations

Statistics
 Passengers
In 2010, the airport handled 10,750 passengers passing through its terminal and gates.

See also
List of airports in the Philippines

Airports in the Philippines
Buildings and structures in Isabela (province)